The Proclamation by the Crown Act 1539 (31 Hen. 8 c. 8; also known as the Statute of Proclamations) was a law enacted by the English Reformation Parliament of Henry VIII. It permitted the King to legislate by decree, ordering that "traditional" proclamations (that is, any unable to impose the death penalty or forfeiture of goods) should be obeyed as "though they were made by act of parliament". In addition the act appointed machinery for their enforcement.

Sir William Blackstone called the Act "a statute, which was calculated to introduce the most despotic tyranny; and which must have proved fatal to the liberties of this kingdom, had it not been luckily repealed."

The Act was once considered to be the height of Henry VIII's despotism. The great efforts made by the King's chief minister, Thomas Cromwell, when drafting the acts of this time show that he was aware of the importance of statute and Parliament.

Cromwell's natural reaction to any problem of government was to draft a bill. However, there were times when an immediate decision or temporary policy was required without having to wait for Parliament. For example, in 1535 it was desired to prevent the export of currency from the realm; Cromwell insisted on finding a relevant statute, although he was relieved to hear from the judges that, in such matters, failing such a statute, the king had the power to issue a proclamation. Nevertheless, Cromwell felt unsatisfied, and hence the Act of 1539, designed to give general legal sanction to royal proclamations.

Cromwell originally intended to allow the common-law courts to enforce these proclamations. However, opposition from the House of Lords forced him instead to accept a council as nominated in the act. This council proved so incapable of doing the work that in 1547, when the Act was repealed, it made no difference to the legality of royal proclamations.

Proclamations would continue to prove controversial, especially when it came to taxation in which it was seen as an arbitrary power, becoming one of the many reasons for the Wars of the Three Kingdoms. Restored Stuart attempts at emulating French absolutism through revival of proclamations would be a factor in causing the eventual Glorious Revolution, leading to the Bill of Rights that entrenched Parliamentary sovereignty.

References

External links
 The text of the act

See also
List of Acts of the Parliament of England to 1601

Acts of the Parliament of England (1485–1603)
1539 in law
1539 in England
Proclamations
1547 disestablishments
United Kingdom administrative law
Royal prerogative
Political law